Oscinellinae is a subfamily of frit flies in the family Chloropidae. There are at least 40 genera and 180 described species in Oscinellinae.

Genera
Apallates Sabrosky, 1980
Aphanotrigonum Duda, 1932
Biorbitella
Cadrema
Calamoncosis Enderlein, 1911
Ceratobarys Coquillett, 1929
Chaetochlorops Malloch, 1914
Conioscinella Duda, 1929
Dasyopa Malloch, 1918
Dicraeus Loew, 1873
Elachiptera Macquart, 1835
Enderleiniella
Eribolus Becker, 1910
Eugaurax
Gampsocera Schiner, 1862
Gaurax Loew, 1863
Goniaspis
Goniopsita
Hapleginella Duda, 1933
Hippelates
Incertella Sabrosky, 1980
Lasiambia Sabrosky, 1941
Lasiochaeta Corti, 1909
Lasiopleura
Liohippelates  (eye gnats)
Lipara Meigen, 1830
Meijerella Sabrosky
Melanochaeta
Microcercis Beschovski, 1978
Monochaetoscinella
Neoscinella
Olcella
Onychaspidium
Opetiophora
Oscinella Becker, 1909
Oscinimorpha Lioy, 1864
Oscinisoma Lioy, 1864
Oscinoides
Polyodaspis Duda, 1933
Pseudogaurax  (parasitic chloropid flies)
Pseudopachychaeta
Psilacrum
Rhodesiella
Rhopalopterum Duda, 1929
Sacatonia
Siphonella Macquart, 1835
Siphunculina Rondani, 1856
Speccafrons Sabrosky, 1980
Stenoscinis
Trachysiphonella Enderlein, 1936
Tricimba Lioy, 1864

References

Further reading

External links

 Diptera.info

 
Brachycera subfamilies